Łukasz Krakowczyk (born 21 February 1998), is a Polish professional footballer who plays as a forward for ROW Rybnik.

Career

Piast Gliwice
On 21 January 2020, Krakowczyk was sent out on his second loan spell, this time to Polonia Bytom until 30 June 2020. Making only one appearance for Polonia, he was loaned out again after returning in the summer 2020, this time to KS ROW 1964 Rybnik for the 2020–21 season.

References

External links

1998 births
Living people
Polish footballers
Association football forwards
Piast Gliwice players
Odra Wodzisław Śląski players
Polonia Bytom players
Ekstraklasa players
I liga players
III liga players
People from Wodzisław County